Rio dos Sinos is a river in the state of Rio Grande do Sul, southern Brazil.

The river basin contains the São Francisco de Paula National Forest, a  sustainable use conservation area created in 1968.

See also
List of rivers of Rio Grande do Sul

References

Brazilian Ministry of Transport

Rivers of Rio Grande do Sul